The 1905–06 Princeton Tigers men's ice hockey season was the 7th season of play for the program.

Season
After a poor season, Princeton returned to a more normal 13-game slate and rebounded with six victories.

Roster

Standings

Schedule and Results

|-
!colspan=12 style=";" | Regular Season

References

Princeton Tigers men's ice hockey seasons
Princeton
Princeton
Princeton
Princeton